Leicester Carriage Sidings are located in Leicester, Leicestershire, England, on the eastern side of the Midland Main Line to the north of Leicester station.

History 
From 1959 to 2007, Class 08 shunters, Class 25, 27 and 45 locomotives could be seen at the depot. Around 1987, the depot had an allocation of Class 08 shunters and Classes 20, 31, 47, 56 and 58 could also be seen stabled at the depot.

Present 
Stabling is provided for CrossCountry Class 170 Turbostars and Network Rail tampers.

References

Sources

Railway sidings in England